Planet Seven (styled as PLANET SEVEN) is the 5th album by Japanese group Sandaime J Soul Brothers from Exile Tribe. It was released on January 28, 2015. It reached the number-one place on the weekly Oricon Albums Chart and stayed at number-one for two weeks. It was the best-selling album in the first half of the year in Japan, with 820,470 copies and it was the 2nd best-selling album of the year in Japan, with 868,247 copies.

Track listing

Charts
Planet Seven - Oricon Sales Chart (Japan)

References

2014 albums